is a Japanese manga artist known for his controversial political commentary manga Gōmanism Sengen.

Life

A student of French literature from Fukuoka University, Kobayashi published his first manga, Tōdai Itchokusen (東大一直線, Beeline to Tokyo U), in 1976 in Weekly Shōnen Jump while still in school. Another of his early series, a satire about a naughty rich boy in the heyday of Japan's bubble economy, won the 1989 Shogakukan Manga Award for children's manga.

Works

 Tōdai Itchokusen (東大一直線, Beeline to Tokyo U) (1976)
 Obocchama-kun (おぼっちゃまくん, Little Princelling) (1986)
 Gōmanism Sengen (ゴーマニズム宣言), vol 1-9
 Gōmanism Sengen Extra 1 (ゴーマニズム宣言EXTRA 1) 
 Gō-Gai! (ゴー外!, Gōmanism Supplement/Side Story) 
 Gōmanism Sengen Sabetsu Ron Special (ゴーマニズム宣言差別論スペシャル, On Discrimination) (1995) 
 Shin Gōmanism Sengen (新・ゴーマニズム宣言) vol 1-14
 Shin Gōmanism Sengen Special - Datsu Seigi Ron (新・ゴーマニズム宣言SPECIAL 脱正義論, On Escaping Correctness) (1996) 
 Shin Gōmanism Sengen Special - Sensō Ron (新・ゴーマニズム宣言SPECIAL 戦争論, On War) (1998), volumes 1-3 (Vol 1: , Vol 2: ,)
 Sabetsu Ron Special - Gōmanism Sengen (差別論スペシャル―ゴーマニズム宣言) (1998) 
 Shin Gōmanism Sengen Special - "Ko to Ōyake" Ron (新・ゴーマニズム宣言SPECIAL ｢個と公｣論, On the "Individual" and the "Public") (2000) 
 Shin Gōmanism Sengen Special - Taiwan Ron (新・ゴーマニズム宣言SPECIAL 台湾論, On Taiwan) (2000) 
 Gōmanism Sengen Special - Yoshirin Senki (ゴーマニズム宣言スペシャル よしりん戦記, Record of the Yoshirin War) (2003) 
 Shin Gōmanism Sengen Special - Okinawa Ron (新・ゴーマニズム宣言SPECIAL 沖縄論, On Okinawa) (2005) 
 Shin Gōmanism Sengen Special - Yasukuni Ron (新・ゴーマニズム宣言SPECIAL 靖國論, On Yasukuni) (2005) 
 Shin Gōmanism Sengen Special - Chōsen-teki Heiwa Ron (新・ゴーマニズム宣言SPECIAL 挑戦的平和論, A Defiant Discussion On Peace), vol 1-2
 Iwayuru A-kyū Sempan - Gōsen Special (いわゆるA級戦犯 ゴー宣SPECIAL, As Called A-class War Criminal)
 Honjitsu no Zatsudan (本日の雑談, Today's Chat)

References

 Howard F. French: Japan's Resurgent Far Right Tinkers With History, New York Times, 25 March 2001.
 Mark Winchester: Everything you know about Ainu is wrong: Kobayashi Yoshinori’s excursion into Ainu historiography, The Asia-Pacific Journal, Vol 9, Issue 22, No 1, 30 May 2011.

External links
 
 Yoshinori Kobayashi manga  at Media Arts Database 

Manga artists from Fukuoka Prefecture
Japanese monarchists
Japanese anti-communists
Nanjing Massacre deniers
Anti-Zionism in Japan
Aum Shinrikyo
Comfort women
People from Fukuoka
1953 births
Living people
Fukuoka University alumni